Edmund Tay Kok Peng (born 27 May 1964), also known as Zheng Geping, is a Singaporean actor and executive producer. He worked for MediaCorp's Chinese-language Channel 8 until he resigned in 2023.

Career
Zheng, a former chef and Taekwondo instructor, became a full-time actor in 1987 after completing SBC's 7th Professional Drama Performers' Training Course, and had been given mostly supporting roles. His hard work finally paid off at the Star Awards 2007 ceremony when he won the Best Actor award for his role in Like Father, Like Daughter. After his Best Actor win in 2007, Zheng's popularity rose when he won the Top 10 Most Popular Male Artistes from the years 2009-2013. He bared his body at the age of 47, putting most men to shame with his solid new six pack. Zheng Geping became the brand ambassador of hair consulting company in June 2013. In August 2013, Zheng released a health and fitness book, Star Fitness.

On 1 February 2023, Zheng resigned from MediaCorp as a full-time artiste.

Personal life
Zheng is married to MediaCorp artiste Hong Huifang. They have a daughter and a son, Tay Ying and Calvert Tay, who also joined the local media scene.

Filmography

Television

Film

Compilation album

Awards and nominations

References

External links
Profile on Toggle

Living people
1964 births
Singaporean male television actors
Singaporean people of Hokkien descent